Hamanumida daedalus, the guineafowl butterfly, is a butterfly of the family Nymphalidae and only member of the genus Hamanumida.

Range
It is found in the Afrotropical realm (Natal, Eswatini, Transvaal, Mozambique, Rhodesia, Botswana, tropical Africa (dry lowland areas) and southwest Arabia).

Description
The wingspan is 55–65 mm for males and 60–78 mm for females. Adults are on wing year-round, with peaks in midwinter and summer.

Food plants
The larvae feed on Combretum and Terminalia species.

References

Butterflies described in 1775
Limenitidinae
Taxa named by Johan Christian Fabricius